Esther Ijewere (formerly Esther Kalejaiye) is a Nigerian advocate, author, women and girl child's rights activist and a columnist for The Guardian. She is a key member of Walk Against Rape (W.A.R), an advocacy initiative created to assist rape victims and seek justice.

Education
Ijewere is a graduate of Sociology from Olabisi Onabanjo University, Ago Iwoye, Ogun State, Nigeria.

Career
Ijewere is the founder of Rubies Ink Initiative for Women and Children, an umbrella organization which covers several women and girl child-related projects including Walk Against Rape, Women of Rubies, Project Capable, Rubies Ink Media and the College Acquaintance Rape Education Workshop. At the start of her career with Rubies Ink, she had to self fund all projects.
In 2013, her activism against rape led her to write the book Breaking the Silence, a book that informs about rape and its scourge. She runs a community for men called Men Who Inspire to celebrate the bravery in men.

Advocacy
In 2015, Ijewere organised a walk against rape which attracted top celebrities like Kate Henshaw, Ali Baba, Toni Payne, DJ Jimmy Jatt and others.
She is a key member of Walk Against Rape (W.A.R), an advocacy initiative created to assist rape victims and seek justice. 
This initiative was endorsed by the Lagos State Ministry Of Women Affairs and Poverty Alleviation.  This campaign led her to organise rape sensitising workshops in secondary schools across the Nigeria tagged College Acquaintance Rape Education (C.A.R.E), in partnership with the Lagos state Ministry of Justice and the Domestic and Sexual Violence Response Team (DSVRT).

Get Talking With Esther 

Get Talking with Esther is an online talk-show (Tweetchat) anchored by Esther aimed at helping people find their voice and communicate their thoughts through words, and promote positivity on social media.

Women of Rubies
She is the publisher of the women focused blog, ‘Women of Rubies ’ which tells the inspirational stories of leading women in different sectors who are contributing their quota to nation building and adding value to the society through their work.

Charity 
With her Rubies Ink Initiative for women and children, Esther reaches out to the downtrodden in the society.

Catalyst 2030 
In May 2022, Esther hosted the catalyst 2030 session on media and public policy. The virtual workshop was hosted during the Catalyzing Change Week 2022(CCW2022).

Awards and nominations 
Her contributions to the Nigerian society has been recognised by several institutions and governmental parastatal. On 9 July 2016, she was awarded the "Young Person of the Year
Award" at the 2016 Miss Tourism Nigeria beauty pageant. She is also a recipient of Wise Women Awards' "Christian Woman in Media Award" which she won in June 2016.
In 2018, Esther won the Social Entrepreneur of the Year Award at the Exquisite Ladies of the Year Awards.

Personal life
Ijewere is a single mum of two kids.
In an interview with The Sun, she advised and encouraged women facing domestic violence in their marriage to reconsider their long term stand in such relationship while speaking on separation from her former husband.

References

Living people
Nigerian women writers
Yoruba women writers
Olabisi Onabanjo University alumni
Nigerian activists
Nigerian women's rights activists
Nigerian women activists
Children's rights activists
Yoruba women activists
Sexual abuse victim advocates
Year of birth missing (living people)